Øyane may refer to:

Øyane, a neighborhood in the city of Stavanger in Rogaland county, Norway
Øyane, Telemark, a village in Fyresdal municipality in Vestfold og Telemark county, Norway
Søre Øyane, a village in Bjørnafjorden municipality in Vestland county, Norway